

Events
 The gangs of Çole, Gaxhai and Pusi i Mezinit are established in Vlorë amidst the Albanian Civil War.
January 7 – "Fat" Herbie Blitzstein was shot to death inside his Las Vegas townhouse.
June 6 – Arrest of Pietro Aglieri, boss of the Santa Maria di Gesù Mafia family in Palermo, in a disused lemon warehouse in the dilapidated industrial area Bagheria together with his "right hand" men, Natale Gambino and Giuseppe La Mattina. It took the authorities almost a year to locate him following the arrest of his right-hand man Carlo Greco. Apparently, Giovanni Brusca, a Riina loyalist arrested in May 1996, helped police identify Aglieri. He had been on the run since 1989.
August – Masaru Takumi, the founding head of the Takumi-gumi, a large branch of the Yamaguchi-gumi, was assassinated by the Nakano-kai.

Arts and literature
8 Heads in a Duffel Bag (film) starring Joe Pesci and David Spade. 
Bella Mafia (film) 
Diaro una siciliana ribelle (film) 
Donnie Brasco (film)  starring Al Pacino, Johnny Depp, Michael Madsen and Bruno Kirby.
Hoodlum (film)  starring Laurence Fishburne, Tim Roth and Andy García.
Jackie Brown (film)  starring Samuel L. Jackson, Michael Keaton and Robert De Niro.
Suicide Kings (film) 
The Last Don (television miniseries)  starring Danny Aiello, Joe Mantegna, and Burt Young.
The St. Valentine's Day Massacre (documentary) Underboss: Sammy the Bull Gravano's Story of Life in the Mafia (non-fiction book) by Peter Maas.Brother'' (film)
Face (film)

Births

Deaths
January - Victor Spilotro, Chicago mobster and brother of Anthony Spilotro and Michael Spilotro
January 2 - Sam Carlisi "Wings", Chicago Outfit boss
May 31 - Johnny Papalia is murdered by Kenneth Murdock
June 7 - Sam DeCavalcante "The Plumber", retired boss of the New Jersey mafia family
August 28 - Masaru Takumi, founding head of the Takumi-gumi
October 22 - Matthew "Mike" Trupiano Jr., St. Louis mafia boss

References

Organized crime
Years in organized crime